Pritchard Peak is a peak in Antarctica rising to over 1800m, 3 nautical miles (6 km) southeast of Saburro Peak in the Doll Mountains, Britannia Range. Named after Colonel Marion Graham Pritchard, Jr., who served as Vice Commander and then Commander of the 109th Airlift Wing during the transition of LC-130 operations from the U.S. Navy to the Air National Guard

Mountains of Oates Land